KKDQ (99.3 FM) is a radio station in Thief River Falls, Minnesota. It is owned by Thomas E. Ingstad and airs a country music format. The station can be listened to online.

References

External links
KKDQ website

Radio stations in Minnesota
Country radio stations in the United States
Thief River Falls, Minnesota